Penicillium pinophilum is a species of fungus in the genus Penicillium which was isolated from a radio set in Papua New Guinea. Penicillium pinophilum produces 3-O-methylfunicone and mycophenolic acid

Further reading

References 

pinophilum
Fungi described in 1910
Taxa named by Charles Thom
Fungi of New Guinea